Tadjoura Airport  is an airport serving the city of Tadjoura in the north-central Tadjoura Region of Djibouti.

References

External links

Airports in Djibouti
Tadjourah Region